Álvaro Odriozola Arzalluz (born 14 December 1995) is a Spanish professional footballer who plays as a right-back for La Liga club Real Madrid and the Spain national team. Mainly a full-back, he can also play as a winger.

Club career

Real Sociedad

Born in San Sebastián, Basque Country, Odriozola joined Real Sociedad's youth setup in 2006, at the age of ten. On 1 September 2013 he made his senior debut with the reserves, starting in a 3–0 Segunda División B away loss against UD Las Palmas Atlético, and in the same month made the first of several appearances in the UEFA Youth League.

Odriozola was definitely promoted to the B-side ahead of the 2014–15 season, and scored his first goal on 6 September 2014 by netting the last in a 3–0 home win against Real Unión. On 25 February 2016, he renewed his contract with Sanse until 2018.

On 16 January 2017, as both Carlos Martínez and Joseba Zaldúa were injured, Odriozola made his first-team – and La Liga – debut by starting in a 2–0 away win against Málaga CF. Up to the end of the campaign, he played in a further 16 competitive matches.

Odriozola renewed his contract until 2022 on 10 June 2017, and was definitively promoted to the senior squad ahead of the 2017–18 season, quickly becoming the first-choice right-back. He scored his first professional goal on 15 February 2018, in the 2–2 draw with FC Red Bull Salzburg in the UEFA Europa League round of 32 at Anoeta Stadium.

Real Madrid
On 5 July 2018, Real Madrid reached an agreement with Real Sociedad for the transfer of Odriozola. The fee was reported to be €30 million, plus €5 million of conditional add-ons. He made his debut on 22 September, playing the full 90 minutes in a 1–0 win over RCD Espanyol. Odriozola scored his first league goal on 21 April 2021, scoring the second goal in a 3–0 win over Cádiz.

Bayern Munich (loan)
After playing just five times for Madrid during the first half of 2019–20, in January 2020 he was loaned to Bayern Munich for the remainder of the season. On 23 August 2020, he won the 2019–20 UEFA Champions League with Bayern.

Fiorentina (loan)
He joined Fiorentina on a season-long loan deal on 28 August 2021.

International career
Odriozola was first selected to play for Spain under-21s by Albert Celades, helping the squad reach the final of the 2017 UEFA European Championship. He earned his first full cap for Spain on 6 October 2017, in a 3–0 win over Albania for the 2018 FIFA World Cup qualifiers; he played the entire match, and also provided an assist for Thiago Alcântara's goal as the team reached the finals as group winners.

Odriozola was named in the 23-man squad for the finals in Russia. He scored his first goal for his country on 3 June 2018, in a 1–1 friendly draw with Switzerland in Villarreal.

Career statistics

Club

International

Spain score listed first, score column indicates score after each Odriozola goal.

Honours
Real Madrid
 FIFA Club World Cup: 2018, 2022

Bayern Munich
 Bundesliga: 2019–20
 DFB-Pokal: 2019–20
 UEFA Champions League: 2019–20

Spain U21
 UEFA European Under-21 Championship runner-up: 2017

References

External links

 Álvaro Odriozola at Real Madrid CF
 
 
 

1995 births
Living people
Spanish footballers
Footballers from San Sebastián
Association football fullbacks
Association football wingers
Real Sociedad B footballers
Real Sociedad footballers
Real Madrid CF players
FC Bayern Munich footballers
ACF Fiorentina players
Segunda División B players
La Liga players
Bundesliga players
Serie A players
UEFA Champions League winning players
Spain under-21 international footballers
Spain international footballers
2018 FIFA World Cup players
Expatriate footballers in Germany
Expatriate footballers in Italy
Spanish expatriate sportspeople in Germany
Spanish expatriate sportspeople in Italy
Spanish expatriate footballers